Elizabeth Hepple (born 7 July 1959) is an Australian former cyclist. She was the first Australian ever to take the podium at Tour de France, placing third in 1988. She competed in the women's individual road race at the 1988 Summer Olympics. In the same year, she also placed third in the Grande Boucle Féminine Internationale and second in the Giro d'Italia Femminile.

References

External links
 

1959 births
Living people
Australian female cyclists
Olympic cyclists of Australia
Cyclists at the 1988 Summer Olympics
Place of birth missing (living people)